VB often refers to volleyball, a team sport.

VB, Vb, and variants may refer to:

Places
 Province of Verbano-Cusio-Ossola (ISO code VB), Italy
 Vero Beach, a city in Florida, USA
 Virginia Beach, a city in Virginia, USA

Companies and organizations
 VB, stock symbol for the Vanguard Small-Cap Index Fund
 VB Pictures, Indian film production company
 VB Rocks, fashion line designed by Victoria Beckham for Rock and Republic
 Veřejná bezpečnost, a Communist-era Czechoslovak police force
 Verkehrsbetriebe Biel, public transport operator in Biel/Bienne, Switzerland
 Villeroy & Boch, producer of ceramics from Germany; abbreviated VB
 VivaAerobús (IATA code VB), Mexican airline
 Vlaams Belang, Belgian political party
 Vlaams Blok, former Belgian political party
 Volksbank, bank in Vienna, Austria
 Vojvođanska banka a.d., active bank in Serbia
 Vojvođanska banka, defunct bank in Serbia

Science and technology 
 VB speed, aircraft design speed for maximum gust intensity
 Valence band of the electrons in a (semiconducting) solid
 Valence bond theory, a theory that uses quantum methods to explain chemical bonding
 Van Biesbroeck's star catalog (VB)
 Visual Basic (classic), a legacy computer programming language from Microsoft
 Visual Basic .NET, a modern object-oriented programming language from Microsoft for .NET
 VirtualBox, an x86-virtualization package from Sun Microsystems
 Vitamin B, a kind of vitamin
 vBulletin, a forum software
Group 5 element in the periodic table according to CAS group numbering
Group 15 element in the periodic table according to old group numbering

Sport 
 Vágs Bóltfelag, a Faroese football club
 VB Sports Club, a Maldivian football club
 Vejle Boldklub, a Danish football club

Other uses 
 Holden VB Commodore, a car produced by the former Australian subsidiary of General Motors, Holden
 Varun Badola an Indian Actor
 Vickers-Berthier, a light machine gun manufactured by Vickers-Armstrong
 Virtual Boy, a video game system by Nintendo
 Victoria Bitter, a beer produced in Victoria, Australia